Phyciodes picta, the painted crescent, is a species of crescents, checkerspots, anglewings, etc. in the butterfly family Nymphalidae. It is found in North America.

The MONA or Hodges number for Phyciodes picta is 4484.

Subspecies
These three subspecies belong to the species Phyciodes picta:
 Phyciodes picta canace W. H. Edwards, 1871
 Phyciodes picta pallescens Felder, 1869
 Phyciodes picta picta (W. H. Edwards, 1865)

References

Further reading

External links

 

Melitaeini
Articles created by Qbugbot